Einārs Tupurītis (born 9 December 1973 in Smiltene, Latvia) is a retired Latvian middle distance runner who specialized in the 800 metres. He competed in college for Wichita State University.

He finished sixth at the 1997 IAAF World Indoor Championships in Paris. He also competed at the World Championships in 1995 and 1997 as well as the 1996 Summer Olympics without reaching the final.

His personal best time over 800 m is 1:43.90 minutes, achieved in July 1996 in Durham. This is the ex Latvian record. The current Latvian 800m record (1:43.67) holds Dmitrijs Miļkevičs. Tupuritis also co-holds the national record in 4 x 400 metres relay, with 3:04,30 minutes from the 1997 World Championships.

References

External links
 
 

1973 births
Living people
People from Smiltene
Latvian male middle-distance runners
Athletes (track and field) at the 1996 Summer Olympics
Olympic athletes of Latvia